Hugh Mackintosh Foot, Baron Caradon  (8 October 1907 – 5 September 1990) was a British colonial administrator and diplomat who was Permanent Representative of the United Kingdom to the United Nations and the last governor of British Cyprus.

Early life and education
Hugh Mackintosh Foot was born in Plymouth on 8 October 1907. He was educated at Leighton Park School in Reading, Berkshire, and went on to study at St John's College, Cambridge, where he graduated with a Bachelor of Arts degree in 1929. He was President of the Cambridge Union and also of the Cambridge University Liberal Club. His three politically active brothers, Dingle, John and Michael, were all educated at Oxford and all became Presidents of the Oxford Union.

Career
Hugh Foot's career in the diplomatic service was both long and distinguished. In Mandatory Palestine, he served as the assistant district commissioner for the Nablus region. During the Second World War he was appointed as British Military Administrator of Cyrenaica, and served as Colonial Secretary of Cyprus from 1943 to 1945. After the War, he served as Colonial Secretary of Jamaica, 1945–47, Chief Secretary for Nigeria, 1947–50 and was appointed to be the Captain-General and Governor-in-Chief of Jamaica in 1951, a post he held until 1957.

He returned to Cyprus as the last colonial Governor and Commander in Chief in 1957 until 1960, when Cyprus gained independence. In 1961, he became British Ambassador to the United Nations Trusteeship Council. After the Labour Party won the 1964 general election, Foot became Minister of State for Foreign Affairs and Permanent Representatives from the United Kingdom to the United Nations from 1964 to 1970. Caradon worked with Charles W. Yost on the Four Power United Nations Middle East negotiations. During his tenure as Permanent Representative, he was sworn of the Privy Council in the 1968 New Year Honours. After his retirement, he became a visiting fellow at Harvard University and Princeton University.

In 1964 Foot was granted a life peerage as Baron Caradon, of St Cleer in the County of Cornwall, the title referring to Caradon Hill on Bodmin Moor, not far from Trematon Castle, which was his country home. He jokingly claimed to be glad to be divested of the surname "Foot", which he considered a standing invitation to wags, as he liked to illustrate by recalling a telegram his father received on his election to parliament: "Foot, congratulations on your feat!" Foot was an active freemason.

Honours and arms
Foot was appointed Officer of the Order of the British Empire (OBE) in the 1939 New Year Honours and elevated Companion of the Order of St Michael and St George (CMG) in the 1946 Birthday Honours. He was elevated Knight Commander of the Order of St Michael and St George (KCMG) in the 1951 New Year Honours and was appointed Knight Commander of the Royal Victorian Order (KCVO) on 27 November 1953. In the 1957 Birthday Honours, he was elevated a Knight Grand Cross of the Order of St Michael and St George (GCMG).

Family
He was one of the four sons of the Liberal Member of Parliament Isaac Foot, his three brothers being the politician Sir Dingle Foot, the life peer Lord Foot, and the journalist and Labour Party leader Michael Foot. "We were proud to be nonconformists and Roundheads", Caradon once wrote of his family: "Oliver Cromwell was our hero and John Milton our poet."

Foot married Florence Sylvia Tod in 1936. She predeceased him in 1985. They had three sons and a daughter together:

 Hon. Paul Mackintosh Foot (8 November 1937 – 18 July 2004), a journalist.
 Hon. Sarah Dingle Foot (24 September 1939 – 28 February 2015), also a journalist.
 Hon. Oliver Isaac Foot (19 September 1946 – 6 February 2008), a charity worker who led Project Orbis International.
 Hon. Benjamin Arthur Foot (born 19 August 1949)

Foot died in Plymouth, aged 82, on 5 September 1990. He was survived by his four children.

References

Works
 Lord Caradon, "The Obligation of Optimism", Conspectus of History 1.8 (1982): 1–9.

External links 

 Entry in Encyclopædia Britannica

1907 births
1990 deaths
Permanent Representatives of the United Kingdom to the United Nations
Presidents of the Cambridge Union
Diplomatic peers
Labour Party (UK) life peers
British Methodists
Cornish Methodists
Colonial Administrative Service officers
Governors of Jamaica
Knights Grand Cross of the Order of St Michael and St George
Knights Commander of the Royal Victorian Order
Officers of the Order of the British Empire
Members of the Privy Council of the United Kingdom
People educated at Leighton Park School
Alumni of St John's College, Cambridge
Harvard University faculty
Princeton University faculty
Governors of British Cyprus
20th-century Methodists
British people of the Cyprus Emergency
Hugh
Colonial Secretaries of Jamaica
Chief Secretaries of Nigeria
Colonial Secretaries of Cyprus
Freemasons of the United Grand Lodge of England
Ministers in the Wilson governments, 1964–1970
Life peers created by Elizabeth II